The Taoyuan Plateau is a plateau located in northern Taiwan. It borders the Linkou Plateau in the northeast, the Hsuehshan Range in the southeast, the Hsinchu Hills in the south, and the Taiwan Strait in the west. In order to irrigate this area, many artificial pools have been created across the plateau. The basin, in which Taoyuan City is located, is a heavily industrialized region with a population of about 2 million.

See also
Dahan River
Geography of Taiwan

Landforms of Taoyuan City
Plateaus of Taiwan